Michael Dwyer is an American architect, known for designing new buildings in traditional vocabularies. He was the editor of Great Houses of the Hudson River (2001), and the author of Carolands (2006).

Education and career

Michael Dwyer graduated from Columbia College and received a master's degree in architecture from the University of Pennsylvania.

He was associated from 1981 to 1996 with the architecture firm Buttrick White & Burtis, where he helped design the Saint Thomas Choir School, a fifteen-story boarding school in Midtown Manhattan, completed in 1987. He was a member of the team that prepared designs for the Central Park Conservancy's rehabilitation of the Harlem Meer in New York City's Central Park, in particular the design of the Dana Discovery Center, completed in 1993. In an interview with the magazine Progressive Architecture in December 1993, Dwyer noted that the building's "picturesque character" was intended to reinforce the park's "romantic landscape design." From 1992 to 1993, he was part of the team of architects that restored Bonnie Dune, the Southampton residence of Ambassador Carl Spielvogel and his wife, the preservationist Barbaralee Diamonstein-Spielvogel, a project executed in collaboration with the interior designer Jed Johnson.

During his time at Buttrick White & Burtis, Dwyer was an advocate for New York's prewar, classical style of architecture. In a 1995 survey by The New York Times of the then-emerging school of neoclassical architecture, the reporter Patricia Leigh Brown noted that, "Michael Dwyer...an architect at Buttrick White & Burtis...has recently completed a classical-style yacht and an $8.95 million town house on the Upper East Side," a house characterized by the architect Robert Stern as "...scholarly...reflecting the elegant manner of Ange-Jacques Gabriel."

After establishing his own firm in 1996, Dwyer was the architect for the Eleanor Roosevelt Monument in New York City's Riverside Park, designed by the landscape architects Kelly/Varnell, with a statue sculpted by Penelope Jencks and inscriptions designed by Dwyer. In 1997, he restored the exterior of the Francis F. Palmer House at 75 East 93rd Street, a designated New York City landmark. From 1998 to 2008, he was the architect for the restoration of the Cosmopolitan Club, a private social club for women. 

In addition to institutional projects, Dwyer designed residential projects for the upper strata of New York's private sector. The financier Dick Jenrette, who called Dwyer his "favorite young neoclassical architect," commissioned him to build a pair of classical pavilions at Edgewater, Jenrette's Hudson River Valley villa. The July 2018 issue of Architectural Digest featured Hollyhock, Dwyer's design for a new house in Southampton for the real-estate executive Mary Ann Tighe, comparable in scale and detail to the prewar houses of architects such as David Adler and John Russell Pope.

Architectural works
35 Meter Cruising Yacht (completed 1995).
Nureyev Apartment, The Dakota, New York City (completed 1995).
Eleanor Roosevelt Monument, Riverside Park, New York City (dedicated 1996).
Windsong (Residence), Shimmo Beach, Nantucket (completed 1996).
Francis F. Palmer House, 75 East 93rd St., New York City (restoration completed 1997).
Garden Pavilion and Poolhouse, Edgewater, Barrytown, New York (completed 1997).
Longview (Residence), 27 Gin Lane, Village of Southampton, NY (completed 2000).
Mead Point (Residence), Indian Field Road, Greenwich, CT (completed 2001).
Lampert Residence, Greenwich, CT (completed 2001).
Stone Cottage (Residence), 21 Toylsome Place, Southampton, NY (completed 2004).
Cosmopolitan Club, New York City (restoration completed 1998–2008).
New Sommariva (Residence), Jefferys Lane, East Hampton, NY (completed 2009).
Hollyhock (Residence), Ox Pasture Road, Southampton, NY (completed 2015).
Triplex Penthouse, San Remo, Central Park West, New York City (completed 2017).

Gallery

Bibliography
 Carl A. Pearson (author); Michael M. Dwyer (illustrator). “Up in Central Park on the shore of Harlem Meer,” Architectural Record (March 1990).
 Mark Alden Branch (author); Michael M. Dwyer (illustrator). “Flirting with folly in Central Park,” Progressive Architecture (August 1991).
 Michael M. Dwyer. "Buildings in public parks," Traditional Building (March/April 1995): 26, 28, 30.
 Michael M. Dwyer. "Building with stone," Traditional Building (March/April 1996): 25–26.
 Michael M. Dwyer. "The arts and crafts in architecture today," Classicist No. 3 (1996–97): 90–96. 
 Michael Dwyer, ed., with preface by Mark Rockefeller. Great Houses of the Hudson River (Boston, MA: Little, Brown and Company, published in association with Historic Hudson Valley, 2001).
 Michael Dwyer, with a foreword by Mario Buatta. Carolands (Redwood City, CA: San Mateo County Historical Association, 2006).

See also
Buttrick White & Burtis
Francis F. Palmer House
Edgewater (Barrytown, New York)
Dick Jenrette
Public art in Central Park

References

External links

Website of Michael Dwyer Architect
Institute of Traditional Architecture 2015 Rankings.
Franklin Report Card at The Franklin Report.

Living people
20th-century American architects
21st-century American architects
20th-century American non-fiction writers
21st-century American non-fiction writers
New Classical architects
Preservationist architects
American neoclassical architects
 Postmodern architects
American architectural historians
Architects from New York City
Architecture firms based in New York City
Historians from New York (state)
Neoclassical architecture in New York (state)
Central Park
Columbia College (New York) alumni
University of Pennsylvania School of Design alumni
1954 births